Diamond FC, is an Anguillan football club based in The Valley. The team finished as runners-up in the AFA Senior Male League during the 2015–16 season.

References

External links 
 Diamond FC Facebook Page
 Official Website

Diamond
Diamond
2014 establishments in Anguilla
Association football clubs established in 2014
The Valley, Anguilla